The 1901 Major League Baseball season was contested from April 18 through October 6, 1901. It was the inaugural season for the American League (AL), with the Chicago White Stockings finishing first in league standings. In the National League (NL), in operation since 1876, the Pittsburgh Pirates finished atop the league standings. There was no postseason.

Each league consisted of eight teams, with each team scheduled to play the other seven teams in the same league 20 times apiece, for a 140-game season.

League leaders

American League

National League

Milestones

Batters
Nap Lajoie (PHA):
Became the fourth player in MLB history and the first in American League history to win the Triple Crown, an achievement of leading a league in batting average, home runs, and runs batted in (RBI) over the same season.

Pitchers
Cy Young (BOS):
Won the pitching triple crown.

Standings

American League

National League

Managers

American League

National League

References

External links
1901 in baseball history from ThisGreatGame.com
1901 Major League Baseball season schedule at Baseball Reference

 
Major League Baseball seasons